Jacob Zook House, also known as the Rodney House and Store, is a historic home located on the East Lincoln Highway in Exton, West Whiteland Township, Chester County, Pennsylvania.

It is a -story, T-shaped, stone dwelling.  The house was built about 1820 in the Federal style.  It has a "T" kitchen wing added in 1850.  It has a one-storey, projecting storefront that replaces the original porch.

In 2010, it housed the "Green Papaya" fast food restaurant; however, from 2013, it housed the "Biryani King" Indian restaurant.

It was listed on the National Register of Historic Places in 1995.

References

Houses on the National Register of Historic Places in Pennsylvania
Federal architecture in Pennsylvania
Houses completed in 1850
Houses in Chester County, Pennsylvania
National Register of Historic Places in Chester County, Pennsylvania